Pittsfield Generating Facility is a natural gas or oil-fired station in Pittsfield, Massachusetts, built and operated by Altresco Pittsfield through 1993 (a subsidiary of Altresco Financial) when sold to J Makowski on behalf of PG&E. 

The plant is under a Reliability Must Run Agreement with ISO New England that requires the plant to be available to run at any time when needed by the regional grid operator.

Description 
The plant consists of 3 GE Frame 6B 40 MW gas turbines running off of natural gas but capable of using fuel oil that feed a common 60 MW heat recovery steam generator.

References

Energy infrastructure completed in 1990
1990 establishments in Massachusetts
Buildings and structures in Pittsfield, Massachusetts
Natural gas-fired power stations in Massachusetts
Oil-fired power stations in Massachusetts